Roberto Soldić (born 25 January 1995) is a Bosnian-born Croatian mixed martial artist and professional boxer, competing in ONE Championship. Before turning 26, Soldić won five belts in five different European MMA promotions including Middleweight and Welterweight Championships in Konfrontacja Sztuk Walki (KSW), Final Fight Championship (FFC) and Superior FC and is considered to be one of the biggest fighting sports prospects from Southeast Europe. 

Soldić is a member of University of Fighting Gym Düsseldorf from Düsseldorf, Germany, where he trains under the tutelage of the gym's owner and manager Ivan Dijaković. Due to Soldić's notoriety, in 2016 UFD Gym Düsseldorf was awarded the title of the best gym in Germany by the choice of Germany's fighting sports portal GNP1.de.

Background 
Soldić was born to Croat parents in Vitez, Bosnia and Herzegovina. While at school, Soldić played soccer but very soon joined a local judo gym in Vitez. Soldić soon realized that he preferred martial arts and he decided to dedicate himself to judo and later to MMA – Mixed Martial Arts. Given that there were no adequate conditions for training in his hometown of Vitez, Soldić was forced to improvise and to train at various gyms in Bosnia and Herzegovina and Croatia. Regardless of those initial setbacks, Soldić made fast progress and soon began his professional MMA career.
In 2015 Soldić met his current coach and manager Ivan Dijaković and decided to make a drastic change in life and career. That same year, Soldić moved to Düsseldorf, Germany, and started training at UFD Gym Düsseldorf that provided much better conditions and where he was able to completely dedicate himself to the sport. After becoming a member of UFD Gym Düsseldorf his career exploded in the following two years and Soldić started to be considered as one of the biggest European MMA prospects.

Mixed martial arts career

Early career 
Soldić made his MMA debut 19 September 2014 at AFC 3: Arti Fighting Championship 3 in Ljubuški, Bosnia and Herzegovina in lightweight division against Ante Alilović. He won via TKO in the second round (2:50). In the same year he scored another professional win when he defeated Mladen Ponjević via submission (guillotine choke) in the first round (00:35) at a local MMA event in Metković, Croatia.

Serbian Battle Championship 
Roberto Soldić scored his first major win and attracted local media attention at Serbian Battle Championship: SBC 5 in May 2015 in Odžaci, Serbia, where he fought Final Fight Championship Futures winner Vladimir Prodanović from Serbia. He defeated Prodanović via TKO in the second round (1:30).
About a year later Soldić became SBC lightweight champion. He won the title at SBC 8 that took place 5 March 2016 in Sombor, Serbia, when he defeated experienced Montenegrin fighter Vaso 'Psychopath' Bakočević via TKO in the third round. Back then, Soldić was only 21 years old.

"When it comes to that match, I controlled my opponent and I could basically read him. He went for a takedown but I defended it well. It was a tough fight, but in the third round I managed to land a middle kick right on his liver which stopped the match. And that's how I defeated The Psychopath," said Soldić after the biggest match of his career up to that point.

In his third SBC match at SBC 14 that took place 8 July 2017 in Bačka Palanka, Serbia, Soldić defeated Slobodan Vukić from Bosnia and Herzegovina via KO in the first round (1:04) in a non-title bout.

Roberto Soldić suffered his first professional setback at MFC 3: Montenegro Fighting Championship 3, that took place in Budva, Montenegro, 27 July 2015. He lost to Marko Radaković via unanimous decision. After two rounds, judges decided in favor of the local fighter which caused a lot of upset in the regional MMA circles and media which claimed that Soldić scored more points. His coaches also revealed to the media that the organizers made last-minute changes to the rules, since the match was initially set for three rounds.
Roberto Soldić won his second MMA title at SMMAC: Swiss MMA Championship 4 that took place 1 October 2016 in Basel, Switzerland. In a welterweight title bout that also served as the main event, Sodić defeated Pascal Kloser from Austria via TKO in the first round (1:34). It was the match that kicked off his impeccable winning streak and got him the title of the biggest fighting sports prospect from Southeast Europe.

Final Fight Championship 
Immediately after winning the SMMAC belt, Soldić was offered a fight at FFC: Final Fight Championship for the vacated welterweight title that was previously held by Laszlo Senyei from Hungary. Previously to that, Soldić made his FFC debut in October 2015 at FFC 20 in Zagreb, Croatia, against Final Fight Championship Futures finalist Saša Drobac. Soldić outworked his opponent in all three rounds and scored a dominant win via unanimous decision. This is still the only win he failed to score via stoppage.

Soldić and his team decided to take a shot at the Final Fight Championship title against one of the most experienced Croatian MMA veterans Ivica Trušček at FFC 27 – Night of Champions that took place 17 December 2016 in Zagreb, Croatia. After a spectacular high kick that stunned Trušček, Soldić poured a brutal GNP on his opponent that made referee Grant Waterman stop the match. Roberto Soldić thus became the FFC welterweight champion in a match prior to which he was considered the underdog in comparison to his more popular and more experienced opponent.

Superior FC 
In his Superior FC debut, Roberto Soldić won another title. In a welterweight title bout at Superior FC 16 that took place 11 March 2017 in Darmstadt, Germany, Soldić defeated Poland's Rafael Lewon via TKO in the third round (1:56). It was fourth title Soldić won in less than a year. At Superior FC 18 Soldić defended his title for the first time when he defeated England's Dez Parker via TKO in the first round (3:29).

Cage Warriors 
On 14 October 2017, Roberto Soldić made his Cage Warriors Fighting Championship debut at CWFC 87 when he locked horns with Lewis Long from Wales. Despite his dominant wins and four belts, Soldić was considered an underdog again. However, it took him only 49 seconds in the first round to defeat his opponent delivering one of the most exciting knockouts of the year in Europe. Soldić stunned Long with a brutal high kick and then he finished him with GNP in a highlight reel knockout.
Former UFC welterweight contender Dan Hardy, who was an analyst and color commentator for the UFC, said that Soldić would be a big UFC star in the future.

I said Cro Cop right away because it was that kick. It was just that, a patient fighter who gets his opponents to that point. Right after the match he jumped on the cage, he looked at me and started yelling that he will be the champ and I believe him. I can't wait to see his progress, he's incredibly exciting, said Hardy.

I came here to become the champ. I already have a couple of belts but I want one more. I will fight anybody anywhere. My score is 11-2, but I lost via decisions and that was robbery, once in Russia and once in Montenegro. So my professional score is basically 13-0. I am a whole different level of fighter compared to these fighters here, said Soldić after the biggest bout of his career.

KSW 
In December 2017, just two months after his big win in the match against Lewis Long, Roberto Soldić stepped into the cage for the fifth time in one year in Polish MMA promotion Konfrontacja Sztuk Walki (KSW). By stepping up on ten days’ notice and accepting welterweight title bout, Soldić decided to take the biggest test in his professional career. His opponent was experienced champion Borys Mankowski. Mankowski’s original opponent Dricus du Plessis from South Africa was forced to withdraw from the match quoting an injury. However, Soldić once again proved that he is ruthless and very efficient. He defeated Manakowski in the KSW 41 main event after only three rounds. After three exhausting rounds, Mankowski and his team decided to give up due to sustained damage. Even before that moment, Soldić delivered a superior performance and controlled his opponent. This was his best MMA performance that secured him a lot of media attention in Poland as well as in Europe in general. With this win, Soldić collected his fifth belt. Besides his original team in the corner, Sodić was also advised by former UFC fighter and Bellator MMA champion Hector Lombard. After this spectacular upset, the Cuban fighter decided to leave the American Top Team and join the UFD team in Düsseldorf, Germany. After winning his fifth belt, Soldić called out Du Plessis.

Soldić faced Dricus du Plessis in his first defence of the KSW Welterweight Championship at KSW 43: Soldić vs. Du Plessis on 14 April. In an upset, Du Plessis dethroned Soldic via TKO, after dropping him with a left hook. The two would later rematch at KSW 45: De Fries vs. Bedorf in the fall of that year, with Soldić defeating Du Plessis via third-round knockout.

Roberto moved up to Middleweight to face former KSW Middleweight champ, Michał Materla, on 14 November 2020 at KSW 56: Poland vs. Croatia. Roberto won the fight via first round TKO.

Soldić defended the KSW Welterweight Championship against challenger Patrik Kincl on 4 September 2021 at KSW 63: Crime of The Century. He won the bout via technical knock out in the third round.

Soldić fought for the KSW Middleweight Championship against champion Mamed Khalidov on December 18, 2021 at KSW 65: Khalidov vs. Soldić. He won the bout and the title via knockout after landing a left hook in the second round.

ONE Championship 
On August 1, 2022, Soldić announced that he signed with ONE Championship.

Soldić made his promotional debut against Murad Ramazanov on December 3, 2022, at ONE on Prime Video 5. During the middle of round one, Ramazanov accidentally connected with a knee to the groin of Soldić, who could not continue. The fight was declared a no contest.

Soldić is scheduled to face Zebaztian Kadestam on May 5, 2023, at ONE Fight Night 10.

Boxing career 

Roberto Soldić also decided to pursue his career in the professional boxing ring. He made his professional boxing debut on 2 April 2016 at a local boxing manifestation in Düsseldorf, Germany, in light heavyweight division. He defeated Goran Ristić via KO in the first round.

On 17 September 2016, Soldić scored his second boxing win in Göppingen, Germany, where he defeated Milan Rus.

Soldić had his third professional boxing match on 11 February 2017 at an event in Düsseldorf, Germany. He scored a win over Nemanja Kragulja.
He scored his fourth win in the boxing ring on 16 November 2017 also in Düsseldorf, Germany, against Slaviša Simeunović via TKO.

Championships and accomplishments 
Konfrontacja Sztuk Walki
KSW Welterweight Championship (Two-time)
Two successful title defenses
KSW Middleweight Championship (One time)
Fight of the Night (one time) vs. Dricus du Plessis (KSW 45)
Knockout of the Night (three times) vs. Vinicius Bohrer (KSW 46), Krystian Kaszubowski (KSW 49), Mamed Khalidov (KSW 65)
Superior Fighting Championship
Superior FC Welterweight Championship (one time)
One successful title defense
Final Fight Championship
 FFC Welterweight Championship (one time)
Swiss MMA Championship
SMMAC Welterweight Championship (one time)

Mixed martial arts record 

|-
|NC
|align=center|20–3 (1)
|Murad Ramazanov
|No Contest (accidental knee to groin)
|ONE on Prime Video 5
|
|align=center|1
|align=center|3:01
|Pasay, Philippines
|
|-
|Win
|align=center|20–3
| Mamed Khalidov
| KO (punch)
| KSW 65: Khalidov vs. Soldić
|
|align=center|2
|align=center|3:40
|Gliwice, Poland
| 
|-
|Win
| align=center| 19–3
| Patrik Kincl
|TKO (punches)
| KSW 63: Crime of The Century
|
|align=center|3
|align=center|2:55
|Warsaw, Poland
| 
|-
|Win
| align=center| 18–3
| Michał Materla
| TKO (punches)
| KSW 56: Materla vs. Soldić
| 
| align=center| 1
| align=center| 4:40
| Łódź, Poland
| 
|-
| Win
| align=center| 17–3
| Michał Pietrzak
| Decision (unanimous)
| KSW 50: London
|  
| align=center| 3
| align=center| 5:00
| London, England
| 
|-
| Win
|align=center| 16–3
| Krystian Kaszubowski
|KO (punch)
| KSW 49: Soldić vs. Kaszubowski
|
|align=center| 1
|align=center| 1:25
|Gdańsk, Poland
| 
|-
| Win
|align=center| 15–3
| Vinicius Bohrer
|KO (punch)
| KSW 46: Narkun vs. Khalidov 2
|
|align=center| 1
|align=center| 4:34
| Gliwice, Poland
| 
|-
|-
| Win
|align=center| 14–3
| Dricus du Plessis
| KO (punches)
| KSW 45: De Fries vs. Bedorf
|
|align=center| 3
|align=center| 2:33
| London, England
| 
|-
|-
|Loss
|align=center|13–3
| Dricus du Plessis
| TKO (punches)
| KSW 43: Soldić vs. Du Plessis
|
|align=center|2
|align=center|1:38
| Wrocław, Poland
| 
|-
|-
|Win
|align=center|13–2
| Borys Mańkowski
| TKO (corner stoppage)
| KSW 41: Mańkowski vs. Soldić
|
|align=center|3
|align=center|5:00
| Katowice, Poland
| 
|-
|-
| Win
| align=center|12–2
| Lewis Long
| KO (head kick and punches)
| Cage Warriors 87
| 
|align=center|1
|align=center|0:40
| Newport, Wales
|
|-
| Win
| align=center|11–2
| Dez Parker
| TKO (punches)
| Superior FC 18
| 
|align=center|1
|align=center|3:29
| Ludwigshafen, Germany
| 
|-
|-
| Win
| align=center|10–2
| Slobodan Vukić
| KO (punch)
| Serbian Battle Championship 14
| 
|align=center| 1
|align=center| 1:04
| Bačka Palanka, Serbia
|
|-
|-
| Win
|align=center|9–2
|Rafal Lewon
|TKO (punches)
| Superior FC
| 
|align=center| 3
|align=center| 1:56
| Darmstadt, Germany
| 
|-
|-
| Win
|align=center|8–2
| Ivica Trušček
| TKO (high kick and punches)
| Final Fight Championship 27
| 
|align=center|1
|align=center|1:47
| Zagreb, Croatia
| 
|-
|-
| Win
|align=center| 7–2
| Pascal Kloser
| TKO (punches)
| SMMAC 4
| 
|align=center| 1
|align=center| 1:34
| Basel, Switzerland
| 
|-
|-
| Loss
|align=center| 6–2
| Yaroslav Amosov
| Decision (split)
| Tech-Krep FC: Prime Selection 8
| 
|align=center| 3
|align=center| 5:00
| Krasnodar, Russia
|
|-
| Win
|align=center| 6–1
| Vaso Bakočević
| TKO (punches)
| Serbian Battle Championship 8
| 
|align=center| 3
|align=center| 1:51
| Sombor, Serbia
| 
|-
| Win
|align=center| 5–1
| Saša Drobac
| Decision (unanimous)
| Final Fight Championship 20
| 
|align=center| 3
|align=center| 5:00
| Zagreb, Croatia
|
|-
| Loss
|align=center| 4–1
| Marko Radaković
| Decision (unanimous)
| Montenegro Fighting Championship 3
| 
|align=center| 2
|align=center| 5:00
| Budva, Montenegro
|
|-
| Win
|align=center| 4–0
| Vladimir Prodanović
| TKO (punches)
| Serbian Battle Championship 5
| 
|align=center| 2
|align=center| 1:30
| Odžaci, Serbia
|
|-
| Win
|align=center| 3–0
| Savo Lazić
| KO (body kick)
| Arti Fighting Championship 4
| 
|align=center| 1
|align=center| 2:05
| Ljubuški, Bosnia and Herzegovina
|
|-
| Win
|align=center| 2–0
| Mladen Ponjević
| Submission (guillotine choke)
| Thunderman Fight Night 1
| 
|align=center| 1
|align=center| 0:35
| Metković, Croatia
|
|-
| Win
|align=center| 1–0
| Ante Alilović
| TKO (punches)
| Arti Fighting Championship 3
|
|align=center| 2
|align=center| 2:50
| Ljubuški, Bosnia and Herzegovina
|

Professional boxing record

See also 
 List of current ONE fighters
 List of male mixed martial artists

References

External links
 
 

1995 births
Living people
Bosnia and Herzegovina male boxers
Bosnia and Herzegovina male mixed martial artists
Croatian male mixed martial artists
Welterweight mixed martial artists
Mixed martial artists utilizing boxing
Mixed martial artists utilizing judo
Croats of Bosnia and Herzegovina
People from Vitez